Bulgarian National Union – New Democracy (BNU-ND) is an ultranationalist political party based in Sofia, Bulgaria. The party claims to be patriotic and purports to protect Bulgarian values. Its leader is Boyan Rasate.

The party opposes the celebration of what it considers non-Bulgarian holidays in the country, including 9 May, "Victory Day". It draws attention by stating protests and by practicing civil disobedience. The Sofia Globe considers it a right-wing, nationalist fringe party, and commented that it has an "unblemished record of never winning any seats in elections".

Objectives of the party 
The party wants a strong centralized state power and rejects the current multi-party parliamentary democracy, calling it "compromised". It wants to dissolve all political parties and all organizations that it claims undermine the foundations of the Bulgarian state and society. The National Assembly should be composed of professionals, elected on a regional basis and competent in their field representatives of different backgrounds and professions. The means of production and the national economy can be both private and public, but the strategic sectors of the economy and public life are to be owned by Bulgarian state.

It favors a conscript army for men and women, and considers the Bulgarian "homeland" to be larger than its current borders. Bulgarian minorities outside of the Republic of Bulgaria are an integral part of the Bulgarian nation and state should protect their interests by any means – such regions include Thrace, Macedonia and Dobruja.

Electoral history

References 

Anti-immigration politics in Europe
Bulgarian nationalism
Nationalist parties in Bulgaria
Far-right parties in Europe
2014 establishments in Bulgaria
Political parties established in 2014